Galaxaura is a genus of thalloid red algae. 

Dichotomous branches are formed; the medulla has a filamentous construction. It may be related to the fossil Gymnocodiaceae.

The genus has cosmopolitan distribution.

Species
As accepted by WoRMS and AlgaeBase;

 Galaxaura articulata 	
 Galaxaura barbata 	
 Galaxaura beckeri 	
 Galaxaura contigua 	
 Galaxaura dichotoma 	
 Galaxaura divaricata 	
 Galaxaura elegans 	
 Galaxaura elongata 	
 Galaxaura filamentosa 	
 Galaxaura glabriuscula 	
 Galaxaura hawaiiana 
 Galaxaura indica 	
 Galaxaura infirma 
 Galaxaura kjellmanii 	
 Galaxaura latifolia 	
 Galaxaura magna 
 Galaxaura pacifica 
 Galaxaura paschalis 
 Galaxaura rugosa 	
 Galaxaura scinaioides 	
 Galaxaura spongiosa 	
 Galaxaura striata 
 Galaxaura tissotii 	
 Galaxaura yamadae 

There are plenty of former Galaxaura species that are now synonyms of other genera.

References

External links
Images of Galaxaura at Algaebase

Red algae genera
Nemaliales
Plants described in 1812